Frederick George Penney or Frederick Gordon Penney (c.1856 – 5 August 1928) was a colonial administrator. He was a cadet of Straits Settlement in 1876 and retired as the Colonial Secretary of Straits Settlements in 1906.

Education
Penney graduated from University of Edinburgh with a M.A.

Personal life
He is the son of William Penney and Louisa Jane Campbell.

Career
In 1876, Penney appointed Cadet of Straits Settlement, and in 1879 as Acting Coroner, Singapore.

In 1880, he was the Acting Collector of Land Revenue, Penang. and in 1883 was appointed Second Magistrate and Commissioner of the Court of Requests, Penang and, in the same year, transferred to Singapore as Second Magistrate and Commissioner of the Court of Requests.

In 1884, he was the Acting First Magistrate and Commissioner of the Court of Requests, Singapore and in July 1886 to June 1887, he was Acting Second Assistant Colonial Secretary when Mr E W Birch was on leave of absence.

On 23 June 1887, he was appointed as Inspector of Schools for Straits Settlements when Mr E C Hill went for a long leave of absence and in 1889, he was the Acting Assistant Colonial Secretary.

On 4 July 1890, he was promoted to Senior District Officer (Province Wellesley) and continue as Acting Assistant Colonial Secretary.

On 12 April 1897, he was appointed Acting Colonial Treasurer and Collector of Stamp Duties and member of the Legislative Council in the consequence of the death of Mr H A O'Brien (Acting Colonial Treasurer) and continue as Senior District Officer (Province Wellesley).

On 24 August 1898, he was appointed as Colonial Treasurer and continue as Collector of Stamp Duties.

On 5 July 1904, he was appointed as Resident Councillor of Malacca and continue as Colonial Treasurer and on 1 January 1905, he was appointed as Colonial Secretary to succeed Sir William Thomas Taylor, who was appointed as the Resident General of the Federated Malaya States (F.M.S.).

Retirement and death
On 13 April 1905, Penney took an eight and a half months leave of absence and later retired in 1906 due to poor health.
He died on 5 August 1928 at the age of 72.

References

1856 births
1928 deaths
Administrators in British Singapore
Chief Secretaries of Singapore